Mehmet Yağmur (born July 1, 1987) is a Turkish professional basketball player for Türk Telekom of the Turkish Basketbol Süper Ligi (BSL). He plays at the point guard position.

Professional career
Yagmur averaged 6.7 points, 4.4 assists and 1.6 steals per game for Sigortam.net İTÜ Basket during the 2019-20 season. He signed with Besiktas on September 25, 2020.

On September 19, 2022, he has signed with Türk Telekom of the Turkish Basketbol Süper Ligi (BSL).

Personal
Yağmur studied at Ege University.

Career statistics

EuroLeague

|-
| style="text-align:left;"| 2015–16
| style="text-align:left;"| Darüşşafaka
| 13 || 10 || 13.9 || .453 || .308 || .556 || 1.0 || 1.6 || .4 || .1 || 4.7 || 3.8
|-
| style="text-align:left;"| 2016–17
| style="text-align:left;"| Darüşşafaka
| 12 || 3 || 2.3 || .000 || .200 || .000 || .1 || .3 || .1 || .0 || 0.3 || -.8

|- class="sortbottom"
| style="text-align:left;"| Career
| style="text-align:left;"|
| 13 || 10 || 13.9 || .453 || .308 || .556 || 1.0 || 1.6 || .4 || .1 || 4.7 || 3.8

References

External links
 Mehmet Yağmur at euroleague.net
 Mehmet Yağmur at fiba.com (archive)
 Mehmet Yağmur at eurobasket.com
 Mehmet Yağmur at tblstat.net
  

1987 births
Living people
Beşiktaş men's basketball players
Darüşşafaka Basketbol players
Ege University alumni
Eskişehir Basket players
Galatasaray S.K. (men's basketball) players
İstanbul Büyükşehir Belediyespor basketball players
İstanbul Teknik Üniversitesi B.K. players
Karşıyaka basketball players
Point guards
Tofaş S.K. players
Turkish men's basketball players
Türk Telekom B.K. players